

The Vajira Mala Order was established on 28 May 1911 (B.E. 2454) by King Rama VI of the Kingdom of Siam (now Thailand) to reward personal service to the sovereign.

Members of the order are entitled to use the postnominals ว.ม.ล.

Insignia
The decoration consists of a single class. The insignia is a pendant, with a blue enamelled figure standing within a golden aura. The aura is framed with a pink enamelled lotus flower outline.

References

External links

 Insignia of the Order, Ministry of Finance, Government of Thailand.

 
Orders of chivalry of Thailand
Awards established in 1911
1911 establishments in Siam